Kukulcania utahana is a species of crevice weaver in the spider family Filistatidae. It is found in the United States.

References

Filistatidae
Articles created by Qbugbot
Spiders described in 1935